The São João River is a tributary of the Paraná River in Paraná state, southern Brazil.

See also
List of rivers of Paraná

References
Brazilian Ministry of Transport

Rivers of Paraná (state)
Tributaries of the Paraná River